Sulejów Abbey is a former Cistercian abbey in Sulejów, Poland, founded in 1176 by Duke Casimir II the Just.

Description
The most notable parts of the abbey are:

 the Romanesque church of Saint Thomas Becket of Canterbury
 the Romanesque fortifications which stopped the Mongol Hordes in the 13th century.

The monastery was dissolved in 1810. After many years of industrial and business use the surviving buildings are now used by the present parish.

The abbey is one of Poland's official national Historic Monuments (Pomnik historii), as designated October 22, 2012.  Its listing is maintained by the National Heritage Board of Poland.

Gallery

See also
Tyniec Abbey

External links
 Sulejów Abbey official website 

12th-century establishments in Poland
Buildings and structures in Łódź Voivodeship
Christian monasteries established in the 12th century
Churches in Łódź Voivodeship
Cistercian monasteries in Poland
Piotrków County
Romanesque architecture in Poland